Jaromír Janáček (born 18 March 1995) is a Czech badminton player.

Career 
In 2011 and 2012, he won Croatian Junior International tournament in mixed doubles event, and became the boys' singles runner-up in 2012. In 2014, he became the runner-up of Slovak Open tournament in men's doubles event.

Achievements

BWF International Challenge/Series (3 titles, 2 runners-up) 
Men's doubles

Mixed doubles

  BWF International Challenge tournament
  BWF International Series tournament
  BWF Future Series tournament

References

External links 
 

1995 births
Living people
People from Český Krumlov
Sportspeople from the South Bohemian Region
Czech male badminton players
Badminton players at the 2019 European Games
European Games competitors for the Czech Republic